Keakamāhana (c. 1610–1665) was an aliʻi nui of Hawaiʻi Island from 1635 to 1665. She ruled as sovereign of the island from the royal complex at Hōlualoa Bay.

Life 
She was the eldest daughter of the King Keakealanikane, the former aliʻi nui of Hawaiʻi. Her mother was Kealiʻiokalani, daughter of Queen Kaikilaniali`iwahineopuna and brother of Keakealanikane. Keakamāhana was a Aliʻi Piʻo, as her mother and father were full blood siblings. She succeeded on the death of her father around 1635. She married her cousin Aliʻi Iwikauikaua, son of Aliʻi Makakaualiʻi, by his wife Kapukāmola. She died in 1665, and her daughter Keakealaniwahine succeed her.

References 

Royalty of Hawaii (island)
Hawaiian queens regnant
1610s births
1665 deaths
17th-century women rulers
17th-century monarchs in Oceania